Arcuites is an ichnofossil genus, interpreted as a eurypterid swimming trace. Traces produced by swimming eurypterids were described from the Silurian Williamsville Formation (Ontario, Canada) and Tonoloway Formation (Pennsylvania, United States) by Vrazo & Ciurca in 2017 as a new ichnogenus and ichnospecies, named Arcuites bertiensis.

References

Eurypterida
Fossil trackways